Philly Jazz was a small jazz record label in Philadelphia, Pennsylvania.

Sunny Murray's Apple Cores features Cecil McBee on bass, Frank Foster on soprano saxophone, pianist Don Pullen and guitarist Monnette Sudler.  Hamiet Bluiett, Fred Hopkins, Arthur Blythe, and Oliver Lake also each appear on one track each.

Sun Ra released two albums on the label, Lanquidity (1978) and Of Mythic Worlds 1979. Byard Lancaster's Exodus and Khan Jamal's The River are both highly sought after.

Discography

External links
Jazzlists: Philly Jazz Inc discography, accessed July 9, 2018.
Discogs

Jazz record labels
American record labels